Enchelidiidae is a family of nematodes belonging to the order Enoplida.

Genera
The following genera are recognised in the family Enchelidiidae:
 
Abelbolla 
Aronema 
Bathyeurystomina 
Belbolla 
Bernardius 
Calyptronema 
Ditlevsenella 
Eurystomina 
Illium 
Ledovitia 
Lyranema 
Megeurystomina 
Pareurystomina 
Polygastrophoides 
Polygastrophora 
Symplocostoma 
Symplocostomella 
Thoonchus

References

Nematodes